Initiative 96 of 2004 is a ballot initiative that amended the Montana Constitution to prevent same-sex marriages from being conducted or recognized in Montana.  The Initiative passed via public referendum on November 2, 2004 with 67% of voters supporting and 33% opposing.

The text of the adopted amendment, which is found at Article XIII, section 7 of the Montana Constitution, states:
Only a marriage between one man and one woman shall be valid or recognized as a marriage in this state.

Results

See also
LGBT rights in Montana

References

External links
 The Money Behind the 2004 Marriage Amendments  OpenSecrets

LGBT in Montana
U.S. state constitutional amendments banning same-sex unions
2004 in LGBT history
Initiatives in the United States
Same-sex marriage ballot measures in the United States
2004 Montana elections
2004 ballot measures
Montana ballot measures